Daniel Roseingrave (c.1655 – May 1727) was an English-born organist and composer mainly active in Dublin, Ireland.

Roseingrave probably hailed from the area of Gloucester, where he was organist at Gloucester Cathedral (1679–1681) and where he later sent his sons for education. He subsequently became organist at Winchester Cathedral (1682–1692) and Salisbury Cathedral (1692–1698), and finally from 1698 at both Christ Church Cathedral, Dublin and St Patrick’s Cathedral, Dublin, which "marked the beginning of a period of half a century when the Roseingrave family dominated the musical scene at the Dublin cathedrals." He remained organist at Christ Church until his death in Dublin in 1727; at St Patrick's his son Ralph joined him from 1719.

He composed some church music including a verse anthem Lord, thou art become gracious. His works are often confused with that of his sons; a disentangling of the works of the various Roseingraves in Ireland was in preparation in 2014.

His sons Thomas Roseingrave and Ralph Roseingrave were likewise composers and organists.

Bibliography
Barra Boydell: Music at Christ Church before 1800: Documents and Selected Anthems (Dublin: Four Courts Press, 1999).
 –– : A History of Music at Christ Church Cathedral, Dublin (Woodbridge, Surrey: Boydell & Brewer, 2004).

References

1650s births
1727 deaths
17th-century classical composers
17th-century keyboardists
17th-century male musicians
18th-century British composers
18th-century British male musicians
18th-century classical composers
18th-century Irish musicians
18th-century keyboardists
British male organists
Cathedral organists
Classical composers of church music
English Baroque composers
English classical composers
English classical organists
English male classical composers
Irish classical composers
Irish classical organists
Irish male classical composers
Male classical organists
People from Gloucester